Kim Hyong-uk (Hangul: 김형욱, Hanja: 金炯旭, January 16, 1925 – c. October 8, 1979) was a South Korean brigadier general who served as director of the Korean Central Intelligence Agency. Born in Hwanghae province, he left for the South after high school and was a classmate of Kim Jong-pil at the Korea Military Academy, graduating in 1949 as members of the 8th graduating class. He was an infantry troop commander in the Korean War. He attended the United States Army Infantry School at Fort Benning, Georgia, in 1955. As colonel, he took part in the May 16 coup in 1961, when he led a group of soldiers to take Prime Minister John M. Chang into custody. He served for two years as Minister for Home Affairs in the junta and then was director of the KCIA from March 1963 to October 1969, where he was notorious for his brutality and corruption. After refusing to support Park's bid for a third term, he was replaced as head of the KCIA by Kim Gye-won. Reportedly, at a meeting with Park, the President asked him, "why don't you take a rest after your long service?"—and on returning to his office, he discovered it had already been cleared out. In 1971, he became a member of the powerless parliament. Kim went into exile in the United States in 1973.

In 22 June 1977, he testified to the Fraser committee about the Koreagate scandal and the activities of Tongsun Park. He also claimed that the Japanese police had had foreknowledge of the kidnapping of Kim Dae-jung. Park had offered him $1 million not to testify, which Kim refused. Kim accepted $500,000 not to publish his memoirs, but reneged on the deal and published them in Japan in April 1979. He disappeared on 7 October 1979, after last being seen in a Paris nightclub. A popular rumor is that Kim was smuggled back to Seoul and personally shot by President Park in the basement of the Blue House. This version was shown in part 12 of the North Korean film series Nation and Destiny. His memoirs were published in South Korea in 1985. In February 2005, the Wolgan Chosun published claims that Kim had been lured from New Jersey to Paris by a hired female entertainer and then been murdered by a French criminal syndicate in pay of the South Korean government. In May 2005, a report from the National Intelligence Service's Truth Commission concluded that Kim had been killed on the orders of Kim Jae-kyu, his successor as director of the KCIA. He was reportedly shot with a silenced pistol and his body was dumped in the woods outside Paris. Three weeks after Kim Hyong-uk's disappearance, Kim Jae-kyu assassinated President Park.

References

1925 births
1979 deaths
Directors of the Korean Central Intelligence Agency
Members of the National Assembly (South Korea)
Gimhae Kim clan
South Korean Buddhists
1979 murders in South Korea